Pradelles-Cabardès is a commune in the Aude department in southern France.

Geography
It lies at the foot of the Pic de Nore.

There is a small reservoir, called Lac de Pradelles.

Population

Economy
Historically, the village supplied blocks of ice to hotels before ice makers were available.

See also
Communes of the Aude department

References

Communes of Aude
Aude communes articles needing translation from French Wikipedia